S. Suria Prakash (born 23 December 1993) is a Singapore international footballer who plays as a winger for S.League club Tanjong Pagar United.

Youth career 
Suria joined the National Football Academy U18 in 2011 before moving to Balestier Khalsa Centre of Excellence the following year.

Club career

Balestier Khalsa 
He made his professional debut for the Tigers in the 2012 S.League.

Warriors FC 
Suria signed for Warriors in 2014. He was handed his first league start in a 1–0 home win over Brunei DPMM on 22 May. His performances in the 2014 season earned him a nomination for the S.League Young Player of the Year award.

He also finished as second top-scorer in the 2014 Prime League, scoring 16 goals for the reserve side.

Young Lions 
After impressing during the 2014 S.League season, Suria was drafted into the Young Lions team for the 2015 S.League season, in preparation for the 2015 SEA Games. On his Young Lions debut, he laid on an assist to help the Young Lions garner a point in the opening game of the season.

Back to the Warriors 
He scored his first league goal of the 2017 S.League season on his first league start, helping his side to a 2-1 win over Home United. It was announced in end-December 2017 that Suria will stay with the Warriors for the 2018 S.League season.

International career 
He made his international debut for Singapore in 2014, playing in a friendly against Papua New Guinea. He gained his second cap 3 days later against Hong Kong.

He was called up by Singapore Under-23 coach Aide Iskandar for the 2015 SEA Games.

Career statistics

International

Honours 
Warriors
 S.League: 2014

References 

1993 births
Living people
Singaporean footballers
Singapore international footballers
Association football midfielders
Balestier Khalsa FC players
Warriors FC players
Young Lions FC players
Singapore Premier League players
Singaporean people of Tamil descent
Singaporean sportspeople of Indian descent
Footballers at the 2014 Asian Games
Asian Games competitors for Singapore